Nancy Goldring (born 1945) is an American artist. Her art practice combines graphic, photographic, and projected material, presented as a non-narrative series of images that she calls "foto-projections." Goldring currently lives and works in New York City, and is a professor emerita, Montclair State University.

Early life and education
Goldring grew up in University City, Missouri. She was educated at University City High School, received a BA in Art History at Smith College, and an MA in Fine Art at NYU. She received her first Fulbright Grant to Italy immediately following Smith College.

Work
While a graduate student, she was a co-founder of Sculpture in the Environment (SITE), an organization of artists dedicated to developing public art projects.  After leaving SITE she began developing her own work, and continued to write about public sculpture. Together with architects Michael Webb of Archigram and Giuliano Fiorenzoli she collaborated on an exhibition, Image of the Home at the Institute for Architecture and Urban Studies in New York City.

Goldring's work incorporates drawing, paper models, photography, and slide projection. Photos are layered like collages and eventually flattened into a final image, evocative of layers of archeological excavation. There is a focus on travel and memory and the final pieces are sometimes shown as large slide projection installations.

Her archive is held by the Smithsonian Institution.

In 2020, she produced an exhibition, “Reflessi di Storia,” as a corporate commission for CFT International Headquarters in Parma, Italy. It remains on permanent view.

Collaborations
Nancy Goldring has worked on numerous collaborations including: 
 SITE 
Image of the Home with Giuliano Fiorenzoli, and Michael Webb
Aureola with Juan Downey, Giuliano Fiorenzoli, and Michael Webb
Stage set design with Ze'Eva Cohen, "Ode"

Exhibitions
Nancy Goldring's work has been shown primarily in the USA, but she has also exhibited in countries such as Italy, India, Japan, Sweden and Czech Republic. A selection of notable individual exhibitions includes: 
Reflessi di Storia CFT Collection, Permanent exhibition, Parma, Italy from Dec. 2019
Photographic work by Nancy Goldring, Carrie Haddad Gallery, Hudson, New York, Sept-Nov. 2018
Projections: Place without Description, Devi Art Foundation, Sarai Center for Developing Studies, Delhi, 2012-2013
Vanishing Points (Punti di Fuga), The Monitor Space, Casa di Architettura, Rome, Apr. 2012; Galleria Martini & Ronchetti, Genoa, Italy, Sept. - Oct. 2013
Palimpsest, Gallery 138, New York City, Mar. 2006
Palinsesto, Palazzo Pigorini, Parma, Italy, 2005, catalog with essays by David Levi Strauss
Legend, Lyman Allen Museum, New London, CT, 2002
Sites and Sets, Baruch College, New York, 2001
Distillations, Southeast Museum of Photography, Daytona Beach, FL, 2000
Foto-Projections, Hampshire College, Amherst, MA, 1993
Images of Myanmar: Inle Lake and Pagan, Arts for Transit, sponsored by MTA, Grand Central Station, New York, 1992
Studio on Stromboli, Mississippi Museum of Art, The Open Gallery, Jackson, MS, 1983
Drawings with Foto-Projections, The Herzliya Museum, The American Cultural Center of Tel Aviv, 1981-1983
Trepidation of the Spheres: Drawings with Foto-Projections, Camera Club, New York, 1981
Drawings with Foto-Projections, SOHO 20, New York, 1980
Nancy Goldring: Drawings, Comfort Gallery, Haverford College, Haverford, PA, 1976
Goldring has also participated in a large number of group exhibitions, including:
Classical Mythology in Modern and Contemporary Art, William Benton Museum of Art, CT, 2012
Everywhere/Nowhere, The Spiritual Temperament in Current American Art, Siri Fort Auditorium, New Delhi, India, 2009
New York New York, Smith College Museum of Art, 2005
Waking Dreams, University of Virginia Art Museum, Charlottesville, VA, 2004
Fresh Work 2, Southeast Museum of Photography, Daytona Beach, FL, 1998
New in the Nineties, Katonah Museum, Katonah, NY, 1996
Ellis Island: Echoes From a Nation's Past, Aperture Foundation, New York, 1989; Palazzo Cini, Ferrara, Italy, 1993
Sequence (Con) Sequence, Bard College, Annandale on Hudson, New York, 1989.
Photography of Invention: Pictures of the Eighties, National Museum of American Art, Washington D.C., 1989
Photography on the Edge, Haggarty Museum of Art, Milwaukee, WI, 1988

Collections
Goldring's work can be found in more than 30 public collections around the world, including: 

 Allen Memorial Museum, Oberlin, Ohio
 Archivio del Comune di Parma, Italy
 Baruch College, New York
 Bibliothèque nationale de France, Paris, France
 Bayley Museum, University of Virginia, Charlottesville, VA
 George Eastman House, Rochester, NY
 Harry Ransom Center for the Humanities, Austin, TX
 Houston Museum of Fine Arts
 International Center of Photography, New York
 International Centre for Photography, Bombay, India
 Padiglione d'Arte Contemporanea, Milan, Italy
 Polaroid Corporation, Westlicht Museum, Vienna, Austria
 Smith College Art Museum, Northampton, Massachusetts
 Southeast Museum of Photography, Daytona Beach FL
 St. Louis Art Museum
 William Benton Museum of Art, Storrs, CT

Publications
Distillations: Nancy Goldring Drawings and Foto-Projections 1971-2021 (Goff ORO Editions, 2022)
Shadow’s Shadow: Shadow of a Doubt, Precog Magazine, Volume 6, 2022
Michael Taussig interview with Nancy Goldring, November Magazine, Volume 1, August 2021 
The Clumsy Ark, (Sprachlichter: 2020)
Shadows’ Shadows, (Metambesen: 2020)
School of Nite, Peter Lamborn Wilson and Nancy Goldring (Spuyten Duyvil Press: Jan 2016)
Putting Yourself in a Place Where Grace can Flow to You, The Brooklyn Rail, Feb 5, 2015
Occupy: 3 Inquiries into Disobedience, Michael Taussig, Photographs by Nancy Goldring, (Chicago University Press, April 2013) 
Reviews, The Architects Newspaper, 2009-2018 
Nancy Goldring on Walls: Enrichment and Ornamentation Reanimation Library Sep, 2012 
Nancy Goldring: Punti di fuga, altri paesaggi, Nancy Goldring, Paolo Barbaro, Michael Taussig, and Carlo Vannicola (Il Geko Edizioni, 2012)
On Why Artists Loved Leo Steinberg, The Brooklyn Rail, April 2011
Palimpsest: fotografie di Nancy Goldring, Nancy Goldring, David Levi Strauss, Paolo Barbaro (Gabriele Mazzotta, 2005)
Distillations, Nancy Goldring, Alison Divine Nordstrom, and Ellen Handy, (Southeast Museum of Photography, Daytona Beach Community College, 2000)
Dream Stills, Avant Garde: Journal of Architecture and Aesthetics, University of CO, September 1993
Imagining Egypt, Avant Garde: Journal of Architecture and Aesthetics, University of CO, July 1991

Recognition
Goldring has been the recipient of awards and grants from such institutions as the Joan Mitchell Foundation, the American Institute of Architecture, New York Foundation for the Arts, New York State Council on the Arts, and the Santa Fe Art Institute. She has received multiple Fulbright Awards to Italy, Sri Lanka, and India, as well as awards from Montclair State University.

References

External links 
 

1945 births
Living people
20th-century American artists
21st-century American artists
People from Oak Ridge, Tennessee
People from St. Louis County, Missouri
Artists from Tennessee
Artists from Missouri
20th-century American women photographers
20th-century American photographers
21st-century American women photographers
21st-century American photographers